Galeandra batemanii is a species of orchid native to Oaxaca, Belize and Central America.

References

External links

batemanii
Orchids of Belize
Orchids of Mexico
Orchids of Central America
Plants described in 1892